Beck Street School is a school building in the Schumacher Place neighborhood of Columbus, Ohio. The building was constructed in 1884 and was designed by prolific school architect David Riebel. The school was recognized as one of Columbus's historically significant schools, in a 2002 report by the Columbus Landmarks Foundation.

Attributes
The Beck Street school is in the Schumacher Place neighborhood of Columbus, Ohio, near German Village.

The three-story building has a symmetrical "monumental block-type design". It was built with influences from Neoclassical and Renaissance Revival architecture. The building sits on a massive stone foundation.

The school was recognized as one of Columbus's historically significant schools, in a 2002 report by the Columbus Landmarks Foundation. The building retains its historic details and character, and only has a single-story addition to its side and rear.

History
Before the school was built, the site was home to the main building of the Franklin County Poor House, built in 1840 and renamed the Franklin County Infirmary in 1850. The building caught fire in 1878 and was repaired, though the facility purchased a new space on Alum Creek Drive in 1882 and moved there in the following year. The building was attempted to be repurposed as a school, though within a year it needed to be replaced.

Beck Street School was built in 1884, designed by David Riebel, who was hired as the first Columbus Public Schools architect in 1893. The building was one of a few, including Avondale Elementary, designed by Riebel before he became the lead architect for Columbus City Schools.

The building closed in 2017. It was listed as one of the city's most endangered sites, in a 2019 list compiled by Columbus Landmarks. The building was vacant, with an unclear future and a valuable property for developers. In 2020, the Columbus Board of Education approved the sale of the building, allowing its use for charter schools, and then potentially for auction. The South Columbus Preparatory Academy opened in the building soon afterward.

See also
 National Register of Historic Places listings in Columbus, Ohio
 Schools in Columbus, Ohio

References

External links

 South Columbus Preparatory Academy

National Register of Historic Places in Columbus, Ohio
Historic district contributing properties in Columbus, Ohio
1884 establishments in Ohio
Elementary schools in Ohio
School buildings completed in 1884
Schools in Columbus, Ohio